Olga Dolzhykova (Olga Dolzhikova; Olga Dolzjikova; born 22 January 1979) is a Ukrainian-Norwegian chess player and educator.

Career
Dolzhykova holds the title of Woman Grandmaster (WGM, 2002). She plays chess for the club , and has represented Norway internationally at the Chess Olympiad and the European Team Chess Championship.

Personal life
Dolzhikova was born in Ukraine. She is a sister of Kateryna Dolzhykova and thus a former sister-in-law of Sergey Karjakin. She moved to Norway in 2012 as a student, and has eventually settled in Norway with her husband and son.

References

External links

1979 births
Living people
Norwegian female chess players
Ukrainian female chess players
Chess woman grandmasters
Norwegian educators